Orlândia is a municipality in the state of São Paulo in Brazil. The population is 44,360 (2020 est.) in an area of 291.8 km². The elevation is 695 m (2,280 ft).

References

Municipalities in São Paulo (state)